2014 Patna stampede was an accident that occurred on 3 October 2014 on the occasion of Dassehra festival at Gandhi Maidan in Patna, Bihar.

Background
The incident occurred when people were returning after watching the "Ravan Vadh" ceremony at the Bihar capital's main Dussehra event at Gandhi Maidan where a huge crowd had gathered to witness the event. Reportedly, 32 people died in the stampede.

Reaction
Prime Minister of India Narendra Modi spoke to the Bihar Chief Minister to inquire about the stampede. He sanctioned ₹2 lac each for the next of those killed and ₹50,000 for critically hurt.

References

Human stampedes in India
History of Bihar (1947–present)
2014 disasters in India
History of Patna
Patna stampede
Disasters in Bihar
October 2014 events in India